Christopher Dibble (born 10 October 1960) is an English former footballer who played as a midfielder in the Football League.

References

External links

1960 births
Living people
English footballers
People from Morden
Footballers from the London Borough of Merton
Association football midfielders
Wimbledon F.C. players
Wealdstone F.C. players
Millwall F.C. players
English Football League players